Qian Tianyi (born 23 January 2000) is a Chinese table tennis player. She was the 2018 World Junior Table Tennis singles champion.

Singles titles

References

External links

Table tennis players from Jiangsu
People from Jingjiang
2000 births
Living people
Chinese female table tennis players
World Table Tennis Championships medalists